
Year 411 BC was a year of the pre-Julian Roman calendar. At the time, it was known as the Year of the Consulship of Mugillanus and Rutilus (or, less frequently, year 343 Ab urbe condita). The denomination 411 BC for this year has been used since the early medieval period, when the Anno Domini calendar era became the prevalent method in Europe for naming years.

Events 
 By place 
 Greece 
 June 9 – The democracy of Athens is overthrown by the oligarchic extremists, Antiphon, Theramenes, Peisander and Phrynichus in an effort by the oligarchists to exert more control over the conduct of the war with Sparta and its allies. A "Council of Four Hundred" is set up. The total defeat of the Athenian expedition to Sicily and the consequent revolts of many of the subject-allies has weakened Athenian finances severely; the acknowledged purpose of the revolutionary movement is to revise the constitution to better run Athens' finances. However, its rule is high-handed and the Council of Four Hundred is only able to maintain itself for four months.
 When a mutiny breaks out amongst the troops who are fortifying Piraeus (the harbour for Athens), the Council sends Theramenes to quell it. Instead, he puts himself at the head of the mutineers. After Phrynichus, the leader of the extremists, is assassinated, an ensuing meeting of the Athenian Assembly deposes the Council and restores the traditional constitution, but restricts some of the privileges of citizenship to a body called the Five Thousand. The Assembly resumes its old form in being a committee of all citizens.
 The Athenian navy under Thrasybulus recalls Alcibiades from Sardis. Alcibiades' election is confirmed by the Athenians at the request of Theramenes. A Spartan fleet in the Hellespont at Cynossema is then defeated by an Athenian fleet commanded by Thrasybulus and Alcibiades.
 Antiphon defends himself in a speech Thucydides describes as the greatest ever made by a man on trial for his life. Nevertheless, Antiphon is unable to persuade his accusers and he is executed for treason.

 By topic 
 Literature 
 Euripides' play Iphigenia in Tauris is performed.
 Aristophanes' plays Lysistrata and Women Celebrating the Thesmophoria are performed.

Births 
 Timoleon, Greek statesman and general (approximate date) (d. 337 BC)

Deaths 
 Antiphon, Athenian politician and orator (b. 480 BC)
 Phrynichus, Athenian general (assassinated)

References